Aileen Aletha Meagher (November 26, 1910 – August 2, 1987) was a Canadian athlete who competed in the 1936 Summer Olympics, sharing bronze in the 4×100 metres event. She was also a painter.

Life 
She was born and died in Halifax, Nova Scotia. She joined the track team at Dalhousie University. She was Canadian record holder in the 100- and 220-yard events.

In 1936 she was a member of the Canadian relay team which won the bronze medal in the 4×100 metres event with her teammates Dorothy Brookshaw, Mildred Dolson and Hilda Cameron. In the 100 metre competition Meagher was eliminated in the semi-finals.

At the 1934 Empire Games she won the gold medal with the Canadian team in the 220-110-220-110 yards relay contest and the silver medal in the 110-220-110 yards relay competition. In the 220 yards event she won the silver medal. Four years later she was part of the Canadian team she won the silver medal in the 110-220-110 yards relay competition and the bronze medal in the 220-110-220-110 yards relay event. In the 220 yards competition she finished fourth.

In 1935, she was awarded the Velma Springstead Trophy, presented annually to Canada's outstanding female athlete. In 1965, she was inducted into the Canadian Olympic Hall of Fame. She is also a member of the Nova Scotia Sport Hall of Fame and the Canada's Sports Hall of Fame. In 2018 Meagher was named one of the greatest 15 athletes in Nova Scotia's history, ranking eighth.

References

External links 

 sports-reference.com
 
 Nova Scotia Sport Hall of Fame profile
 Aileen Meagher: Olympic Medallist and Canada's Flying Schoolmarm at Nova Scotia Archives & Records Management
 
 
 
 

1910 births
1987 deaths
Canadian female sprinters
20th-century Canadian painters
Olympic track and field athletes of Canada
Athletes (track and field) at the 1936 Summer Olympics
Olympic bronze medalists for Canada
Athletes (track and field) at the 1934 British Empire Games
Athletes (track and field) at the 1938 British Empire Games
Commonwealth Games gold medallists for Canada
Commonwealth Games silver medallists for Canada
Commonwealth Games bronze medallists for Canada
Canadian people of Irish descent
Sportspeople from Halifax, Nova Scotia
Commonwealth Games medallists in athletics
Medalists at the 1936 Summer Olympics
Olympic bronze medalists in athletics (track and field)
20th-century Canadian women
Olympic female sprinters
Canadian women painters
Medallists at the 1934 British Empire Games
Medallists at the 1938 British Empire Games